Angelic may refer to:
 Angel, a supernatural being
 Angelic (band), a British trance band 
 Angelic acid, an organic compound
 Angelic de Grimoard, brother of Pope Urban V
 Angelic Encounters, an album by the Dutch band Thanatos
 Angelic language (disambiguation)
 Angelic Layer, a 1999 Japanese comics
 Angelic Organics, a community-supported agriculture farm in Caledonia, Illinois, US
 Angelic Pretty, a Japanese fashion company
 Angelic Society, a secret society
 Angelic tongues, a term related to a Jewish theme
 Angelic Upstarts, an English musical band
 The Angelic Conversation (disambiguation)

See also
 Angelique (disambiguation)